Ajoa Mintah is a Ghanaian Canadian engineer and entrepreneur known for founding Four All Ice Cream, based in Kitchener, Ontario.

Early life and education
Mintah was born to Ghanian parents who married after meeting in Canada. Her father worked in food science, including for a time with United Nations, and her mother was a lawyer. 

Mintah studied chemical engineering at the University of Waterloo. She graduated with a BASc in 2011. Before transitioning her career into ice cream production, she took a course about ice cream in the food science department at the University of Guelph.

Career
After graduating from the University of Waterloo, Mintah worked in automotive, research and consulting, and accounting sectors. 

Four All Ice Cream was founded in 2017. The business began production in a factory space in Kitchener, holding pop-up shops in the Region of Waterloo before opening a retail space in 2020. The name of the company is tied to Mintah's focus on four categories of ice-cream; nostalga, foodie, vegan and classic flavours. Her ice cream uses locally sourced products and relies on a stabilizing process she engineered in order to extend the product's shelf life while minimizing additives. 

In August 2021 Mintah created a flavour called Our Heroes Eat Ice Cream in recognition of front line hospital works, with some of the proceeds from sales going to a fund to support staff at Kitchener's Grand River Hospital.

References

Canadian people of Ghanaian descent
University of Waterloo alumni
Living people
Canadian women engineers